Steve Bartek (born January 30, 1952, in Garfield Heights, Ohio) is an American guitarist, film composer, conductor, and orchestrator. He is best known as the lead guitarist in the band Oingo Boingo and for his orchestration work with composer Danny Elfman.

Career

Early career
Bartek's career started while at William Howard Taft High School in Woodland Hills, California, writing songs and playing flute with the psychedelic rock band Strawberry Alarm Clock. In 1974 he graduated from UCLA with a degree in Composition.

After college he worked at the Baked Potato with Leon Gaer under the leadership of Don Randi until joining the theatrical ensemble The Mystic Knights of the Oingo Boingo in 1975, where he met his collaborator Danny Elfman.

Between 1979 and 1995, Bartek was lead guitar in new wave band Oingo Boingo with Elfman.  Bartek also orchestrated the horn arrangements for the band and co-produced many of their albums.

Film and television
Bartek has composed music for television series including The Tick, Tales from the Crypt, Nightmare Ned and Steven Spielberg's Amazing Stories, and movies including An Extremely Goofy Movie, Romy and Michele's High School Reunion, Romy and Michele: In the Beginning, Snow Day, Novocaine, the 1998 remake of Psycho and The Art of Travel. In 1992 he was nominated for a Saturn Award for his soundtrack to Guilty as Charged. In 2005, together with Danny Elfman and Stewart Copeland, he was awarded an BMI Film & TV Award for his work on Desperate Housewives.

As an orchestrator, Bartek has worked on over 50 productions with Danny Elfman as of 2007, including most Tim Burton productions, Mission: Impossible, Good Will Hunting, Spider-Man and Milk, and has done orchestration work with composers Jon Brion and Stephen Trask.

Bartek provided the soundtrack for Donovan Cook's indie film Rideshare: The Movie, alongside former Oingo Boingo member Johnny "Vatos" Hernandez.

In 2015 Steve performed the theme to Harvey Beaks.

Other work
Steve Bartek did horn arrangements for Avenged Sevenfold's song "A Little Piece of Heaven" as well as for John Hiatt's "Little Head". He produced Raya Yarbrough's eponymous album and arranged strings for the song "Early Autumn". He also did a string arrangement for Ricky Martin's "Vuelve".

Bartek played the acoustic guitar on the Bangles cover of "A Hazy Shade of Winter" on the Rick Rubin arranged soundtrack for the 1987 film "Less Than Zero".

Bartek plays guitar for the TV series Battlestar Galactica, Trauma and Walking Dead.

Bartek also contributed music to both the ride queue and exit of Disneyland's short-lived Rocket Rods attraction in 1998, including a synthesizer arrangement of Steppenwolf's "Born to Be Wild" and "World of Creativity (Magic Highways of Tomorrow)", the latter being a radical re-arrangement of "Detroit", a song originally written and composed by the Sherman Brothers for the 1967 Disney film, The Happiest Millionaire.

Bartek is an admirer of composer Raymond Scott, and in 2012, he worked with Ego Plum in arranging a live tribute show held at the Walt Disney Concert Halls REDCAT entitled "Machine Man: The Musical Mayhem of Raymond Scott". 
 
Bartek played guitar on Gerald Casale's 2021 single, "I'm Gonna Pay U Back".

Select filmography
1989 Communion (1989 film)
1991 Guilty as Charged
1991 Past Midnight
1994 Cabin Boy
1995 National Lampoon's Senior Trip
1995 Coldblooded
1997 Romy and Michele's High School Reunion
1998 Meet the Deedles
1998 Psycho
2000 Snow Day
2000 An Extremely Goofy Movie
2000 The Crew
2001 Get Over It
2001 Novocaine
2003 Carolina
2007 The Simpsons Movie
2010 Despicable Me

References

External links

 
 

1952 births
Living people
People from Garfield Heights, Ohio
American music arrangers
American rock guitarists
American male guitarists
American television composers
American film score composers
American male film score composers
American new wave musicians
20th-century American guitarists
Guitarists from Ohio
20th-century American male musicians
21st-century American guitarists
Strawberry Alarm Clock members
21st-century American male musicians